Adrian Colin Cameron (born 13 September 1956) is an Australian economist. He is a professor of economics at University of California, Davis. Cameron is known for his graduate-level textbook Microeconometric Methods and Applications, co-authored with Pravin K. Trivedi.

Cameron graduated with a PhD in economics from Stanford University in 1988.

References

External links
 Website at UC Davis
 

1956 births
Living people
Australian economists
Australian National University alumni
Stanford University alumni
University of California, Davis faculty